Black Swan Songs is a remix album in 2006 by Epik High. This is Epik High's first repackage album.

Track listing
Disc 1

Disc 2
 사진첩 (Photo Album)
Paris (정재일's Black Swan Remix)(featuring Jisun of Loveholic)
Lesson 3 (Street T's Street Cred Remix)(featuring MC Meta)
Swan Songs (Pe2ny's Sweet Music Remix)(featuring TBNY)
Lesson 1 (Supreme T's Ghetto Child Remix)
Follow The Flow (Street's Diamond Remix)(featuring Tiger JK)
 Lesson 2 (Instrumental)
 Fly (Instrumental)
 Innisfree Remix [Hidden Track]

External links
  Epik High's Official Site

2006 albums
Epik High albums